Gurkanan castle is a historical castle located in Esfarayen County in North Khorasan Province, The longevity of this fortress dates back to the Early and middle centuries of post-Islamic historical periods.

References 

Castles in Iran